The Leutascher Ache (also: Leutasch, in its upper range Gaistalbach) is a river of Tyrol, Austria and of Bavaria, Germany, a left tributary of the Isar.

The Leutascher Ache springs in the Mieming Range in the region of Ehrwald in Tyrol and flows firstly in northern direction. After passing through the Leutasch Gorge, it discharges into the Isar in Bavaria near Mittenwald.

References

External links 
 Cycle route along the Leutascher Ache (travel information at Wikivoyage)
 river guide online at kajaktour.de

Rivers of Bavaria
Rivers of Tyrol (state)
Rivers of Austria
Rivers of Germany
International rivers of Europe